Toppertown is an unincorporated community in Stoddard County, in the U.S. state of Missouri.

A variant name was "Topper".  The community has the name of one Mr. Topper, proprietor of a local sawmill.

References

Unincorporated communities in Stoddard County, Missouri
Unincorporated communities in Missouri